Procaris chacei is a species of shrimp in the family Procarididae. It is endemic to Bermuda.

References

Decapods
Endemic fauna of Bermuda
Freshwater crustaceans of North America
Taxonomy articles created by Polbot
Crustaceans described in 1986
Taxa named by Raymond B. Manning